Newbold may refer to:

Places
United Kingdom
 Newbold, Derbyshire, England
 Newbold Community School
 Newbold, Harborough, Leicestershire, England 
 Owston and Newbold, civil parish in Harborough, Leicestershire
 Newbold, North West Leicestershire, England
 Newbold, Greater Manchester, England
Newbold tram stop, Rochdale, England
 Newbold-on-Avon, Warwickshire, England
 Newbold Quarry Park
 Newbold on Stour, Warwickshire, England

United States 
 Newbold, Wisconsin, a town
Newbold (community), Wisconsin, an unincorporated community
 Newbold, Philadelphia, Pennsylvania, a neighborhood

Other uses
 Newbold (name), a list of people with the surname or given name
 Newbold College, a Seventh-day Adventist private school in Binfield, Berkshire, England

See also
 Newbold Astbury, Cheshire, England
 Newbold Pacey, Warwickshire, England
 Newbold Verdon, Leicestershire, England
 Newbold Comyn, a park in Leamington Spa
 Newbolds Corner, New Jersey
 Newbald
 Newbolt